Dynamo Blues F.C. is an Irish association football club based in Tuam, County Galway. They were founded in 1978. The club have 3 Adult teams competing in the Galway & District League, including a Ladies side which started in 2021. The Ladies team reached the Galway FA Championship Cup Final in only their first season in 2022. 

They remain the only club from Tuam and the surrounding areas to have won the Galway & District League Premier Division.

Ground
The New Club grounds are currently in construction in An Tuairín  Dublin Road Tuam, It will include 2 full size pitches, 1 training pitch & clubhouse. The club for many years played their home games on the College Field on Athenry Road. 

The pitch was completed in 2022, with the first game taking place on the 10th April against Cois Fharraige C.S.. The home side were victorious, winning 3-2.

Honours
Connacht Senior Cup
Winners: 1985–86: 1
Galway & District League
Winners: 1981–82, 1984-85: 2

References 

Association football clubs established in 1978
Association football clubs in County Galway
Galway & District League teams
Sport in Tuam
1978 establishments in Ireland